Pontcarré is a commune in the Seine-et-Marne department in the Île-de-France region in north-central France.

Geography

Geology
The commune is classified in a zone of Seismicity 1, corresponding to a very weak seismicity.

Hydrography
The Morbras River, a Tributary of the Marne, has its source in the town.

Demographics
The inhabitants are called  Pontcarréens.
In 2013, the total number of dwellings in the municipality was 846 (of which 72.6% were houses and 27.3% were apartments). Of these dwellings, 94.1% were principal residences, 0.2% were second homes and 5.7% were vacant dwellings. The share of households owning their principal residence was 82.3%.

See also
Communes of the Seine-et-Marne department

References

External links

Official site 
1999 Land Use, from IAURIF (Institute for Urban Planning and Development of the Paris-Île-de-France région) 

Communes of Seine-et-Marne
Seine-et-Marne communes articles needing translation from French Wikipedia